Persoonia cordifolia is a species of flowering plant in the family Proteaceae and is endemic to a restricted area in the south of Western Australia.

Description
Flowering occurs from December to January.

Taxonomy and naming

Distribution and habitat

References

cordifolia
Flora of Western Australia
Plants described in 1994
Taxa named by Peter H. Weston